Tsogkhuugiin Udval (born 18 August 1994) is a Mongolian female ju-jitsu practitioner.

She represented Mongolia at the 2018 Asian Games and claimed a bronze medal in the women's 62kg ne-waza event.

References 

1994 births
Living people
Mongolian female martial artists
Ju-jitsu practitioners at the 2018 Asian Games
Medalists at the 2018 Asian Games
Asian Games bronze medalists for Mongolia
Asian Games medalists in ju-jitsu
21st-century Mongolian women